Flat or flats may refer to:

Architecture
 Flat (housing), an apartment in the United Kingdom, Ireland, Australia and other Commonwealth countries

Arts and entertainment
 Flat (music), a symbol which denotes a lower pitch
 Flat (soldier), a two-dimensional toy soldier made of tin or plastic
 Flat (theatre), a flat piece of theatrical scenery
 Flat, a leading type of wordplay, as identified by the National Puzzlers' League
 Flat! (2010), an Indian film
 Flats (band), an English band
 Flats (comics), the first stage in the comic coloring process

Footwear
 Flats, footwear which is not high-heeled
 Ballet flats, derived from ballet shoes, for casual wear as well as dancing
 Ballet shoes (also known as ballet slippers), often referred to as "flats" or "flat shoes"
 Racing flats, lightweight shoes used primarily for running a race

Geography

Landforms
 Flat (landform), a relatively level area within a region of greater relief

Bodies of water 
 Flat, a shallow water area in the context of boating, fishing or marine biology, often used in plural form
 Brewster Flats, an area of Cape Cod Bay off the shore of Massachusetts, U.S.
 Kentish Flats Offshore Wind Farm, off the coast of Kent, England
 Rhyl Flats, a wind farm off the coast of North Wales
 Flat coast, a shoreline where the land descends gradually into the sea

Places

United States
 Flat, Alaska, a census-designated place
 Flat, Kentucky, an unincorporated community
 Flat, Missouri, an unincorporated community
 Flat, Texas, an unincorporated community
 Flat Brook, a tributary of the Delaware River in Sussex County, New Jersey
 Flats, Nebraska, United States
 Flats, West Virginia, an unincorporated community
 Forest Lake Area Trail System, Missouri

Other
 Flat, Puy-de-Dôme, a commune in the French region of Auvergne
 Flat Island (disambiguation), in various places
 Flat Islands (disambiguation), in Canada and Antarctica
 Flat River (disambiguation), in the United States and Canada

Mathematics and geometry
 Flatness (mathematics), of a surface
 Flat (geometry), the generalization of lines and planes in an n-dimensional Euclidean space
 Flat (matroids), a further generalization of flats from linear algebra to the context of matroids
 Flat module in ring theory
 Flat morphism in algebraic geometry
 Flat space, a space with zero curvature
 Flat sign, for its use in mathematics; see musical isomorphism, mapping vectors to covectors

People

Nickname
 Earl "Flat" Chase (1910–1954), Canadian baseball player
 Flat Walsh (1897–1959), Canadian ice hockey goaltender

Fictional characters
 Flat Eric, a character in some Levi's commercials
 Flat Stanley, namesake of an American children's book series

Groups
 FLATS or First Lady Astronaut Trainees, American women who underwent NASA Project Mercury physiological screening tests

Other uses
 Flat (gridiron football), the area of the gridiron football field
 Flat butterflies or flats, certain skipper butterfly genera in subfamily Pyrginae:
 Calleagris (scarce flats),
 Celaenorrhinus of tribe Celaenorrhinini;
 Eagris, and
 Tagiades (water flats, snow flats), of tribe Tagiadini
 Flats (USPS), an oversized letter
 Optical flat, an extremely flat piece of glass

See also
 
 
 The Flat (disambiguation), including "The Flats"
 Flatten (disambiguation)
 Flattening
 Flatness (disambiguation)